Muharasi is a 1966 Indian Tamil-language film, directed by M. A. Thirumugam. Based on G. Balasubramaniam's play Moondrezhuthil En Moochirukkum, itself inspired by the 1964 film The Pitiless Three, the film stars M. G. Ramachandran and Gemini Ganesan in their only film together. The film, produced by Sandow M. M. A. Chinnappa Thevar under his Thevar Films banner, was released on 18 February 1966 and ran for 100 days.

Plot 

Because she refused to cooperate, Mangalam, a fair mother, pays with her life. She is cruelly stabbed by Duraiswamy, a notable, who put himself up to spirit away the colossal fortune of his deceased brother. He acts so meanly in front of little Somu, (Mangalam's elder son), the terrorised child who memorises the face of Duraiswamy.

15 years later, Somu is living only for one thing: to take revenge. He settled in his purpose of finding the murderer and killing him with his own hands. His young brother Ramu, a police officer of a formidable efficiency, big in integrity and whose reputation precedes him, is moved into the same direction as Duraiswamy!

Ramu is in love with Jaya, who turns out that to be one of the two girls of Duraiswamy, the criminal whom Somu has looks for desperately for years. Ramu tried vainly to tear away from his older brother Somu, the truth on the identity of the murderer of their mother. It is there that their opinion on justice diverges. Somu wants death, whereas Ramu demands a judgment (sentence) in front of a court for the murderer of their mother!

Cast 

Lead actors
 M. G. Ramachandran as Assistant Commissioner of Police Ramu
 Gemini Ganesan as Somu

Male supporting actors
 M. N. Nambiar as Duraisamy
 S. A. Ashokan as Jambhu
 Nagesh as Police Constable 501
 V. K. Ramasamy as Senior Police Constable 777, Singaram
 Sriram as A good-for-nothing corrected by Ramu
 Sandow M. M. A. Chinnappa Thevar as Sangili

Lead actresses
 Jayalalitha as Jaya
 Jayanthi as Malliga

Supporting actresses
 Manorama as Alangaram (Thandhaiyar Paithai)
 P. K. Saraswathi as Meenatchi

Production 
Muharasi, adapted from G. Balasubramaniam's play Moondrezhuthil En Moochirukkum, itself inspired by the 1964 film The Pitiless Three, was the only film where M. G. Ramachandran and Gemini Ganesan acted together. Though actors like S. A. Ashokan, K. Balaji or M. G. Chakrapani were considered, Ramachandran chose Ganesan. Filming was completed within 18 days.

Soundtrack 
The music was composed by K. V. Mahadevan, with lyrics by Kannadasan.

Release and reception 
Muharasi was released on 18 February 1966, and distributed by Emgeeyar Pictures. Writing for Sport and Pastime, T. M. Ramachandran gave a negative review citing "There is nothing much to write home about the direction by M. A. Thirumugam". He said M. G. Ramachandran gave a "consummate performance" while Ganesan was "almost an unsympathetic role [..] he tends to overdo" and Jayalalithaa "tries hard to make presence felt". Kalki said Nambiar's performance lacked newness, and none of the songs were memorable.

References

External links 
 

1960s Tamil-language films
1966 films
Films directed by M. A. Thirumugam
Films scored by K. V. Mahadevan
Indian films based on plays